Boolgeeda Airport  is an airport serving the Brockman 4 mine in the Pilbara region of Western Australia.

The airport officially opened on 27 November 2012 with a regional flight from Busselton while direct flights from Perth commenced on 3 December.

Airlines and destinations

See also
 List of airports in Western Australia
 Aviation transport in Australia

References

External links

 Airservices Aerodromes & Procedure Charts

Pilbara airports
Rio Tinto Iron Ore
Airports established in 2012
Shire of Ashburton